Pteronarcys princeps, the ebony salmonfly, is a species of giant stonefly in the family Pteronarcyidae. It is found in North America.

References

Further reading

 
 
 
 
 
 
 
 
 

Plecoptera
Insects described in 1907